Simon Dushinsky (born 1972) is an American real estate developer who co-owns the New York City-based Rabsky Group with his partner, Isaac Rabinowitz.

Biography
Dushinsky was born and raised in Israel and belongs to the Vizhnitz Hasidic Jewish community in Williamsburg, Brooklyn. 
Dushinsky co-founded The Rabsky Group with Isaac Rabinowitz in the early 1990s and focused on developing condominiums for the Hasidic community. In 2002, he completed his first major development, a $40 million, six-building Park Plaza condo complex for Hasidic residents. In 2007, The Rabsky Group purchased a 50 percent stake in six industrial buildings owned by the Chetrit Group (founded by Joseph Chetrit) for $4 million. His firm lead the redevelopment of the buildings due to their familiarity with the neighborhood. As of 2015, his firm is working on several large projects in New York City including a 500-unit Bushwick rental building which is part of the Rheingold Brewery redevelopment with 200 affordable housing units. a 777-unit rental building in Bedford-Stuyvesant on the former Pfizer Corporation site; and a 44-story, 400-unit residential rental building in Long Island City, Queens. In 2015 - in his first non-residential venture - he is partnering with Toby Moskovits’ Heritage Equity Partners to build a 400,000-square-foot office building in Williamsburg.

Dushinsky is currently focused on attracting young renters to Bushwick, Brooklyn which he sees as the next development hotspot. Along with fellow Hasidic developers Joseph Brunner, Isaac Hager, Yoel Goldman, and Joel Schreiber he is one of the most prominent developers in Brooklyn credited with helping to gentrify Williamsburg, Bushwick, Greenpoint, Borough Park, and Bedford-Stuyvesant.

Personal life
Dushinsky is known for being very private and modest. He is married with seven children. He has made political donations to the campaigns of Melinda Katz, David Yassky, and former City Council Speaker Gifford Miller.

References

American real estate businesspeople
Businesspeople from New York City
Israeli emigrants to the United States
Israeli Orthodox Jews
American Orthodox Jews
Vizhnitz (Hasidic dynasty) members
1972 births
Living people
People from Williamsburg, Brooklyn